The siege of Ponda was a siege of Ponda, Goa, during the Imperial Maratha Conquests. The siege lasted from 8 April to 6 May 1675.

In his attack on the west coast of India, the forces of the Maratha King Shivaji encircled the fortress of Ponda, held by Bijapuri troops. The fortress was stormed by Shivaji's troops after Mughal commander Bahlol Khan did not send reinforcements. The fortress' commander, Muhammad Khan, was one of the few to escape the massacre of the garrison. The capture of Ponda resulted in the Maratha Empire capturing most of the western part of the Carnatic region.

See also 
 Battle of Salher

References 

Conflicts in 1675
Ponda
History of Goa